Norman Earl Steenrod (April 22, 1910October 14, 1971) was an American mathematician most widely known for his contributions to the field of algebraic topology.

Life
He was born in Dayton, Ohio, and educated at Miami University and University of Michigan (A.B. 1932). After receiving a master's degree from Harvard University in 1934, he enrolled at Princeton University.  He completed his Ph.D. under the direction of Solomon Lefschetz, with a thesis titled Universal homology groups.

Steenrod held positions at the University of Chicago from 1939 to 1942, and the University of Michigan from 1942 to 1947.  He moved to Princeton University in 1947, and remained on the Faculty there for the rest of his career. He was editor of the Annals of Mathematics and a member of the National Academy of Sciences. He died in Princeton, survived by his wife, the former Carolyn Witter, and two children.

Work

Thanks to Lefschetz and others, the cup product structure of cohomology was understood by the early 1940s. Steenrod was able to define operations from one cohomology group to another (the so-called Steenrod squares) that generalized the cup product. The additional structure made cohomology a finer invariant. The Steenrod cohomology operations form a (non-commutative) algebra under composition, known as the Steenrod algebra.

His book The Topology of Fibre Bundles is a standard reference. In collaboration with Samuel Eilenberg, he was a founder of the axiomatic approach to homology theory.  See Eilenberg–Steenrod axioms.

See also
Abstract nonsense
Eilenberg–Steenrod axioms
Fiber bundle
Steenrod algebra
Steenrod homology
Steenrod operations
Steenrod problem

Publications

References

External links

 Michael Hoffman (2013) Norman Steenrod  from US Naval Academy

1910 births
1971 deaths
20th-century American mathematicians
Harvard University alumni
People from Dayton, Ohio
Princeton University alumni
Princeton University faculty
Topologists
University of Chicago faculty
University of Michigan faculty
University of Michigan alumni
Mathematicians from Ohio
Members of the United States National Academy of Sciences